The Camden County Board of County Commissioners  is a board of seven people who govern Camden County, New Jersey. The board is led by the director and deputy director, who are chosen by the board every year. The current director is Commissioner Louis Capelli, Jr, and the current deputy director is Edward McDonnell.

Responsibilities 
The board is responsible for governing the county. The board also writes, approves, and executes the counties legislation.

Party Affiliation

Sessions

2019 
On March 22, Commissioner William Moen resigned so he could run for New Jersey General Assembly in the 5th Legislative District. He was replaced by Melinda Kane.

Previous Sessions

References 

Camden County, New Jersey
County government in New Jersey